Paul Matheson (born 1947) is a former mayor of Nelson, New Zealand.

Paul Matheson may also refer to:

Paul Matheson (figure skater), see 1996 Canadian Figure Skating Championships
Paul Matheson (curler), see 2011 Labatt Tankard

See also
Paul Mathiesen (disambiguation)